Giovanni Sacco (25 September 1943 – 17 December 2020) was an Italian professional footballer who played as a midfielder.

He died from COVID-19 during the COVID-19 pandemic in Italy.

Honours
Juventus
 Serie A champion: 1966–67.

References

1943 births
2020 deaths
Italian footballers
Association football midfielders
Serie A players
Juventus F.C. players
S.S. Lazio players
Atalanta B.C. players
A.C. Reggiana 1919 players
Deaths from the COVID-19 pandemic in Piedmont
People from San Damiano d'Asti
Footballers from Piedmont
Sportspeople from the Province of Asti